Karen Fuller Brannen (née Tribbett) was the first United States Marine Corps female strike fighter pilot.

Military career 
She joined the armed forces in 1994 and left active duty in 2007, but remains a reserve Colonel in the Marine Corps.  During her career she attained the rank of major, then progressed to Lt. Col.

Civilian career 
After leaving active duty, she started working for Gulfstream.

Awards 
She was inducted into the Women in Aviation International Pioneer Hall of Fame in 2013, becoming the first marine inducted. She was a USMC F/A-18 pilot for 3 years, before being the first woman to be awarded 'wings of gold'.

Personal life
She married Matt Brannen in 2010.

References

Living people
Female United States Marine Corps personnel
United States Marine Corps officers
Year of birth missing (living people)
21st-century American women